Charles Sternberg may refer to:

Charles Hazelius Sternberg (1850–1943), American fossil collector and amateur paleontologist
Charles Mortram Sternberg (1885–1981), American-Canadian palaeontologist, son of the above